The rigid double splayed loop in the bight is a knot that contains two parallel loops.  Clifford Ashley wrote that it is "one of the firmest of the Double Loops since the two loops do not directly communicate with each other".  (In actuality, it can be argued that the two loops do directly communicate as the two center portions of each loop simply pass down through the head knot and pass around the running ends; not significantly different, in that regard, from the Spanish Bowline). It is a variation of the alpine butterfly knot.

References

External links 
 Double Loop Knots: A Rigid Double Splayed Loop in the Bight

Multi-loop knots